The Shaw Mansion is an Italianate style house in the George's Creek Valley of Allegany County, Maryland, built in 1872. The house is significant as an unusually large and well-preserved example of the style for its area, with stone trim, detailed brick bonding, cast-iron mantels and much of the original interior woodwork.

It was listed on the National Register of Historic Places in 1985.

References

External links
, including 1977 photo, at Maryland Historical Trust

Houses on the National Register of Historic Places in Maryland
Italianate architecture in Maryland
Houses completed in 1872
Houses in Allegany County, Maryland
National Register of Historic Places in Allegany County, Maryland